Blauvelt is a surname. Notable people with the surname include:

Abraham Blauvelt (died 1663), Dutch privateer
Andrew Blauvelt (born 1964), Japanese-American curator, designer, educator, and writer
Christopher Blauvelt, American cinematographer
George A. Blauvelt (1866–1924), American lawyer and politician
Harvey Blauvelt (1867–1929), American baseball player
Lillian Blauvelt (1873–1947), American opera singer